The Ravensburg Razorbacks are an American football team in Ravensburg Germany. As its greatest success, the club reached the German Football League, the highest level in Germany, by having won the promotion play-off against Kirchdorf Wildcats in the postseason 2019.

History
The Ravensburg Razorbacks were formed in 1987. The team's first name was Lindenberg Razorbacks. It moved to Ravensburg and therefore changed the name to become part of the sports club TSB 1847 Ravensburg. In 1988, the Razorbacks started in the 4th and lowest German league level.

After many not very successful years, the Razorbacks won the championship of the Oberliga Baden-Württemberg in 2009 to be promoted to the Regionalliga Mitte (third level). Three years later they won the Regionalliga Mitte and were promoted to the German Football League 2. After returning to the Regionalliga in 2015, they repeated their success and played in the 2016 season again in the GFL 2. This time the rise of the team continued. After finishing 5th and 2nd they won the division title of the GFL 2 South in 2018. In the subsequent play-offs the Razorbacks fell short of being promoted  to the GFL against the Stuttgart Scorpions. One year later the entered again the promotion round as division winners. This time they won twice against the Kirchdorf Wildcats and thus, are qualified to compete in the German Football League in the 2020 season.

Honours
 GFL 2
 Southern Division champions: 2018, 2019

Recent seasons

 PR = Promotion round

References

External links
  Official Website
  German Football League official website
  Football History Historic American football tables from Germany

German Football League teams
American football teams in Germany
American football teams established in 1987
1987 establishments in West Germany
Ravensburg
Sport in Tübingen (region)